Eduardo Blanco (1897 – 1958) was an Argentine footballer who played as midfielder. Blanco spent all his career in Rosario Central, where he played from 1914 to 1918, winning three national titles and seven regional titles with the club.

Blanco debuted in Rosario Central in 1914, playing 69 matches and scoring 10 goals. Nevertheless, his career as player ended abruptly because of an injure to his left knee. Blanco became manager of Rosario Central in 1930.

Apart from his club career, Blanco was also capped for the Argentina national team, being part of the team that competed in the 1917 South American Championship, where Argentina was runner-up.

Titles
Rosario Central
 Copa Ibarguren (1): 1915
 Copa de Honor MCBA (1): 1916
 Copa Jockey Club (1): 1916
 Copa Nicasio Vila (4): 1914, 1915, 1916, 1917
 Copa Damas de Caridad	(3): 1914, 1915, 1916

References

External links
 

1897 births
1958 deaths
Argentine footballers
Argentina international footballers
Place of birth missing
Association football midfielders
Footballers from Rosario, Santa Fe